La La Love to Dance is the second studio album by German virtual band Gummibär. It was released on 9 March 2010 on the Gummybear International label as a follow-up of the successful I Am Your Gummy Bear. It contains 19 songs interpreted by Gummibär.

Track listing
"Mr. Mister Gummibär"
"Don't Turn Around (Gummibär's in Town)"
"Nuki Nuki (The Nuki Song)"
"Celebrate (We Want To)"
"It’s a Great Summer"
"Boogie Woogie Dancin’ Shoes"
"Boom Bing Bing"
"La La La I Love You (Skatebär)"
"Dancin' Dancin' (What I Need)"
"Jump Jump"
"Life Is Just a Bag of Tricks"
"Discó Mackó"
"Call Me Call You"
"Cotton Eye Joe"
"Aerobic"
"Happy Birthday Gummibär"

Bonus tracks
"Nuki Nuki – Hip Hop Version"
"It's a Great Summer – St. Tropez Club Mix"
"La La La I Love You (Skatebär) – NRG Mix"

Chart positions

References

External links
Gummibär website

2010 albums
Gummibär albums